The Serbian Tricolour Hound is a breed of scent hound from Serbia.

History
The Serbian Tricolour Hound, like the closely related Serbian Hound, Montenegrin Mountain Hound, Posavac Hound, Istrian Shorthaired Hound, Istrian Coarse-haired Hound and Barak Hound, is believed to have descended from hounds traded by Mediterranean seafarers through ports on the Adriatic coast. All scent hounds, these breeds are believed to also have some early sighthound blood in their ancestry.

According to Serbia's national kennel club the Kinološki Savez Srbije, the Serbian Tricolour Hound was initially considered a variety of the Serbian Hound, but in 1946 a separate breed standard was drawn up and it was granted separate recognition. The breed was recognised by the Fédération Cynologique Internationale in 1961. Originally called the Yugoslavian Tricolour Hound, the breed's name was changed after the breakup of Yugoslavia.

Rarely seen outside of its homeland, the Serbian Tricolour Hound is considered extremely rare and at possible risk of extinction.

Description

Appearance
The Serbian Tricolour Hound is a moderately sized scent hound that is very similar to the black and tan coloured Montenegrin Mountain Hound, but typically is slightly lighter in build. Their bodies are slightly longer than they are tall, they have long legs and good bone.

The breed's coat is short, thick, glossy and course to touch, it provides the breed with good protection from the elements; in colour they are predominantly black and fawn with a white around the neck, on the chest on their extremities and a blaze on the face.

Character
The Serbian Tricolour Hound is usually affectionate and obedient, forming a particularly strong bonds with their masters. Tranquil and relaxed in the home environment, the breed is known to be particularly energetic when working.

Use
Serbian Tricolour Hounds are versatile hunters often hunted in small packs, predominantly they hunt by scent but they also utilising their very good vision. The breed is used to hunt hare, fox, deer and wild boar, the terrain they are typically hunted over is known to be difficult and the hunts are known to continue for many hours at a time.

See also
 Dogs portal
 List of dog breeds

References

FCI breeds
Rare dog breeds
Scent hounds
Dog breeds originating in Serbia